Lake Agassiz
Glacial Lake Aitkin
Bear Lake, in Lowville Township, Minnesota was actually a wooded area with four lakes: Bear Lake proper, Crooked Lake, Hawk or Rush Lake, and Tibbetts or Great Oasis Lake.
 Lake, in Murray County, Minnesota east of Lime Creek 
Glacial Lake Duluth
Glacial Lake Grantsburg
Glacial Lake Minnesota
Rat Lake, in Westbrook Township, Minnesota, west of Bean Lake and Double Lake
Glacial Lake Upham

References

 
Lakes of Minnesota
Lakes